Estanislao Esteban Karlic (born 7 February 1926) is an Argentine cardinal of the Catholic Church. He served as Archbishop of Paraná from 1986 to 2003, and was elevated to the cardinalate in 2007.

Biography
Estanislao Karlic was born in Oliva, Villa María, to an immigrant Croatian family. He studied at the Major Seminary of Córdoba, and at the Pontifical Gregorian University in Rome, from where he obtained a licentiate in theology. Following his ordination to the priesthood on 8 December 1954, Karlic served as superior of the philosophy section of the Major Seminary of Córdoba, where he was also professor of theology.

On 6 June 1977, Karlic was appointed titular bishop of Castrum by Pope Paul VI. He received his episcopal consecration on the following August 15 from Cardinal Raúl Francisco Primatesta, with Bishops Alfredo Disandro and Cándido Rubiolo serving as co-consecrators. Karlic was later named Coadjutor Archbishop of and Apostolic Administrator of Paraná on January 19, 1983, eventually succeeding to the post of its Archbishop on April 1, 1986. From 1986 to 1992, he was a member of the commission for the redaction of the new Catechism of the Catholic Church. In 1999, Karlic called for unity among the people of the Western Hemisphere and for the respect of small nations' cultures. He served as President of the Argentine Episcopal Conference for two successive terms (1996–1999, 1999–2002) before resigning as Paraná's archbishop on April 29, 2003, after seven years of service.

Pope Benedict XVI created him Cardinal-Priest of Beata Maria Vergine Addolorata a piazza Buenos Aires in the consistory of November 24, 2007. As he was beyond the age of 80 at the time of his elevation, Karlic will never be eligible to participate in a papal conclave.

Cardinal Karlic is seen as theologically moderate and as a conciliator between conservative and liberal factions in the Argentine Church. He believes that “the family is the sanctuary of love and of life” and that “the human community is destined for fraternity”.
Cardinal Karlic celebrated his 45th episcopal anniversary on 15 August 2022 with a Mass of thanksgiving. The 97-year-old cardinal resides in the Benedictine Monastery of Our Lady of Paraná, in Aldea María Luisa.

References

External links

 
Catholic-Hierarchy 
Cardinals of the Holy Roman Church
bio at catholic-pages.com

1926 births
Living people
People from Villa María
Argentine people of Croatian descent
Argentine cardinals
20th-century Roman Catholic archbishops in Argentina
21st-century Roman Catholic archbishops in Argentina
Cardinals created by Pope Benedict XVI
Pontifical Gregorian University alumni
Roman Catholic bishops of Córdoba
Roman Catholic archbishops of Paraná